Disraeli Lufadeju (born March 5, 1992) is an English professional basketball player.

References

British Basketball League players
1992 births
Living people
Place of birth missing (living people)
Point guards